Aslauga abri is a butterfly in the family Lycaenidae. It is found in north-western Tanzania. The habitat consists of forests.

References

External links
Images representing Aslauga abri at Barcodes of Life

Butterflies described in 1997
Aslauga
Endemic fauna of Tanzania
Butterflies of Africa